Steneretma laticauda is a species of ulidiid or picture-winged fly in the genus Steneretma of the family Ulidiidae.

References

Ulidiinae